There are over 9000 Grade I listed buildings in England. This page is a list of these buildings in the county of Derbyshire, sub-divided by district.

Amber Valley

|}

Bolsover

|}

Chesterfield

|}

City of Derby

|}

Derbyshire Dales

|}

Erewash

|}

High Peak

|}

North East Derbyshire

|}

South Derbyshire

|}

Notes

See also
 :Category:Grade I listed buildings in Derbyshire
 Grade II* listed buildings in Amber Valley
 Grade II* listed buildings in Bolsover (district)
 Grade II* listed buildings in Chesterfield
 Grade II* listed buildings in Derby
 Grade II* listed buildings in Derbyshire Dales
 Grade II* listed buildings in Erewash
 Grade II* listed buildings in High Peak
 Grade II* listed buildings in North East Derbyshire
 Grade II* listed buildings in South Derbyshire

References 
National Heritage List for England

External links

 
Grade I listed buildings